These are the official results of the Women's 800 metres event at the 1987 IAAF World Championships in Rome, Italy. There were a total number of 32 participating athletes, with four qualifying heats, two semi-finals and the final held on Monday August 31, 1987.

Medalists

Records
Existing records at the start of the event.

Final

Semi-finals
Held on Sunday 1987-08-30

Qualifying heats
Held on Saturday 1987-08-29

References
 Results

 
800 metres at the World Athletics Championships
1987 in women's athletics